Scandinavian Heritage Park is a park located in the Upper Brooklyn neighborhood of Minot, North Dakota. Scandinavian Heritage Park features remembrances and replicas from each of the Scandinavian countries: Norway, Sweden and Denmark, as well as Finland and Iceland.
The park was established during 1988 to celebrate and preserve Scandinavian heritage. The first building was dedicated October 9, 1990.

It is believed to be the only park in the world representing all five Nordic countries. The park is supported by the Scandinavian Heritage Association and Norsk Høstfest, both of which have offices at the park.

Park Highlights
 Casper Oimoen statue - Norwegian born captain of the ski team for the United States at the 1936 Winter Olympics
 Dala Horse - 30 feet tall replica of brightly colored horses from the province of Dalarna, Sweden
 Danish Windmill - working windmill on rock and concrete base built locally in 1928
Finnish Sauna - authentic free standing sauna built in traditional Finnish style 
 Flag Display - flags of the five Nordic countries, Canada and the United States
 Gol stave church - replica of the original Gol Stave Church that was built in Gol, Hallingdal, Norway
 Hans Christian Andersen statue - Danish writer famous for his fairy tales 
 Leif Eirikssen statue - bronze statue of the Icelandic explorer 
 Nordic Pavilion - Arts and Picnic Shelter
 Observatory - 48-inch diameter spinning marble globe fountain
 Plaza Scandinavia - granite map of the five Nordic countries
 Scandinavian Heritage Center - office of the Scandinavian Heritage Association
 Sigdal House - 200-year-old house relocated from the Vatnas area of Sigdal, Norway
 Sondre Norheim statue - Norwegian born father of modern skiing 
 Sondre Norheim eternal flame - monument represents the sport of skiing
 Stabbur - replica of a storehouse from a farm near Telemark, Norway 
 Waterfall - cascading waterfall and rippling stream that flows down to serene ponds

References

External links

Scandinavian Heritage Association

Museums in Minot, North Dakota
Danish-American culture in North Dakota
Ethnic museums in North Dakota
Finnish-American culture in North Dakota
Icelandic-American culture in North Dakota
Norwegian-American culture in North Dakota
Open-air museums in North Dakota
Parks in North Dakota
Protected areas of Ward County, North Dakota
Swedish-American culture in North Dakota
European-American museums
Norwegian-American museums
Swedish-American museums
Scandinavian-American culture
Protected areas established in 1988
1988 establishments in North Dakota